Harold Daniell (29 October 1909 – 19 January 1967) was a British professional Grand Prix motorcycle road racer and auto racing driver. He competed in the 1940s and 1950s. On retiring from racing he owned a Norton motorcycle dealership in Forest Hill, London.

Harold Daniell and George Rowley rode the supercharged AJS V4s in the 1936 Isle of Man Senior TT, but despite its high top speed, it lacked acceleration. Both riders retired due to mechanical problems.

In the 1938 Isle of Man TT' Daniell completed the first under 25-minute (24min.52.6sec), 91.00 plus mph, lap of the Isle of Man TT Snaefell Mountain Course on his Norton in the Senior TT, a record which would stand for 12 years. He won, beating Stanley Woods by only 14.4 seconds.

Daniell competed in the 1949 Grand Prix motorcycle racing season riding on a 500cc Norton and finished sixth overall with 17 points in the World Championship while Leslie Graham and Nello Pagani finished first and second respectively. In the same year he also won the Isle of Man Senior TT and was placed fifth in the Junior TT. His victory in the Senior TT makes him the first race winner of the MotoGP (then 500 cc) class.

Daniell's Isle of Man TT racing career spanned the years from 1930 until 1950 and included three victories and several placings in the Tourist Trophy races but he also competed in the Manx Grand Prix. Daniell declared that the new Norton was like "riding on a featherbed" compared with riding the "garden gate" - and it has been called the Featherbed frame ever since. After his motorcycle racing career, Daniell began auto racing, entering Formula 3 events at the wheel of an Emeryson car.

World Championship results 

(key) (Races in bold indicate pole position; races in italics indicate fastest lap.)

References

External links
 Harold Daniell profile at iomtt.com
 500cc Formula Three Drivers

1909 births
1967 deaths
British motorcycle racers
English motorcycle racers
500cc World Championship riders
Isle of Man TT riders
English racing drivers
Place of birth missing